Goal 2 may refer to:
 Goal II: Living the Dream - a movie
Goal! Two - a video game
Sustainable Development Goal 2 - a goal by the United Nations